Inazuma Eleven is a 2008 to 2011 Japanese anime television series based on Level-5's video game series of the same name. The animated series was produced by OLM under the direction of Katsuhito Akiyama and consists of 127 episodes.

Endou Mamoru is a cheerful goalkeeper in Raimon Jr High, along with six other players in the team. But there was a day when the team was almost lead to disbandment by Natsumi unless they are to win the match against the Teikoku Gakuen, currently the best team of Japan. He tries to save the club by gathering four more players to the team.

The opening theme is "Tachiagari-yo". The closing theme is "Seishun Oden" performed by Twel'v.

Episode list

References

Inazuma Eleven episode lists